This lists ranks the tallest buildings in Lucknow, the capital of the Indian state Uttar Pradesh, India. Shalimar One World Iconic Tower standing  and 30 floors tall will be the tallest building in the city when completed in 2023.

Tallest buildings
This list only includes complete and topped out buildings in Lucknow that stand at least  or 21 floors tall. This includes spires and architectural details but does not include antenna masts.

Tallest under construction 

This list ranks buildings that are under construction in Lucknow and are planned to rise at least  or 21 floors or more. Buildings that are approved, On-Hold or proposed are not included in this table.

Timeline of tallest buildings of Lucknow

References

Lucknow
Buildings, tallest
Tallest
Tallest buildings in Lucknow